Probstei is an Amt ("collective municipality") in the district of Plön, in Schleswig-Holstein, Germany. It is situated around Schönberg, which is the seat of the Amt.

Subdivision
The Amt Probstei consists of the following municipalities:

Barsbek 
Bendfeld 
Brodersdorf 
Fahren 
Fiefbergen 
Höhndorf 
Köhn 
Krokau 
Krummbek 
Laboe 
Lutterbek 
Passade 
Prasdorf 
Probsteierhagen
Schönberg
Stakendorf 
Stein
Stoltenberg
Wendtorf 
Wisch

References 

Ämter in Schleswig-Holstein
Regions of Schleswig-Holstein